Miyu Shirako (白子未祐	, Shirako Miyū, born 22 July 1995) is a Japanese rugby sevens player. She competed in the women's tournament at the 2020 Summer Olympics.

References

External links
 

1995 births
Living people
Female rugby sevens players
Olympic rugby sevens players of Japan
Rugby sevens players at the 2020 Summer Olympics
Sportspeople from Tokyo
Japan international women's rugby sevens players
Universiade medalists in rugby sevens
Universiade gold medalists for Japan
Medalists at the 2019 Summer Universiade